In human mitochondrial genetics,  Haplogroup L6 is a human mitochondrial DNA (mtDNA) haplogroup.  It is a small African haplogroup.

Distribution

This haplogroup has been found most often in Yemen and Ethiopia.

Subclades

Tree
This phylogenetic tree of haplogroup M subclades is based on the paper by Mannis van Oven and Manfred Kayser Updated comprehensive phylogenetic tree of global human mitochondrial DNA variation and subsequent published research.

L3'4'6
L6
L6a
L6b

See also 
Genealogical DNA test
Genetic genealogy
Human mitochondrial genetics
Population genetics
Human mitochondrial DNA haplogroups

References

External links 

General
Ian Logan's Mitochondrial DNA Site
Mannis van Oven's Phylotree

L6